Vivek Naidu (born 8 July 1979) is an Indian first-class cricketer who plays for Chhattisgarh. He made his first-class debut in 1999.

References

External links
 

1970 births
Living people
Indian cricketers
Chhattisgarh cricketers
Vidarbha cricketers
Railways cricketers
Wicket-keepers